Butterfly is the tenth studio album by Taiwanese singer Jolin Tsai. It was released on March 27, 2009, by Warner and Mars. Tsai worked on the album with various producers, including Adia, Paul Lee, Peter Lee, and Paula Ma. It was poorly received by music critics, who commented that the tracks were popular but lacked surprise, sincerity, and breakthrough.

The album was pre-ordered more than 120,000 copies in Taiwan, becoming the country's most pre-ordered album of all time. It sold more than 1 million copies in Asia. In Taiwan, it sold more than 210,000 copies, becoming the year's highest-selling album.

Background and development 
On July 4, 2008, Tsai's manager Howard Chiang said that Tsai would begin to work on her new album in August 2008. On October 14, 2008, it was reported that Tsai would sign a recording contract with Warner in December 2008, and Tsai had learnt new dance moves and had filmed music video in New York City by the end of September 2008, Howard Chiang said: "She is actively working on the album, and hope it would be released before the year end." On November 23, 2008, Tsai said that her new album would be released around Chinese New Year of 2009.

On December 16, 2008, Tsai signed a recording contract with Warner. On the same date, Tsai revealed that she had finished recording for her new album and would begin to film music videos, she added: "The album includes ten tracks based on dance-pop, and it merged different genres which I've never tried before, I also worked with F.I.R.'s Real Huang, he wrote a rock ballad for me, and it sounds very good." On January 29, 2009, Tsai said that her album would be released in late March 2009. On February 27, 2009, Tsai said that the album would include a duet with Nick Chou. On the same date, Warner indicated that the budget for the album would be more than NT$60 million.

Writing and production 

"Real Man" is the Chinese version of Lexington Bridge's song under the same title, and it features Nick Chou. The song merged dance-pop with hip-hop, and it depicts modern women's criteria for ideal partner. "Compromise" is a rock ballad. It describes a helpless but common phenomenon in modern people's emotions, and Tsai said: "The concept of love which describes in the song is quite similar to mine when I fall in love, because I'll compromise a lot to my partner and finally get hurt, I don't dare to speak problems, and it's easy to lose myself, it's my biggest shortcoming. So interaction is very important to each other, not just unilateral compromise." "Butterfly" describes that modern women should insist to be themselves and not be afraid of other people's views. "Slow Life" is the Chinese version of Lena Philipsson's "Det gör ont", and Tsai said: "Modern people are in a hurry to deal with a lot of things, constantly changing relationships and jobs, we should actually slow down and enjoy the slow pace of life."

"Accompany with Me" is a tender and affectionate positive love song, and Tsai said: "This song is sweet and suitable for playing on the wedding day. It tells partner that you are my dependence, and I am willing to accompany you through life, age, illness, and death, it is very sweet." "Love Attraction" is a French-style romantic and sweet song, and it is the Chinese version of Vanessa Paradis's "Divine Idylle". "The Shadow Dancer" is based on the concept of "dancing in the dark", and it describes some people think only of their partner, just like the dancers in the dark can be only seen their shadow. In "Parachute", Tsai wishes people who expect love can have love falling from the sky like parachute, Tsai added: "I like to express my views on love in a figurative way." "You Hurt My Feelings" is a bitter and poignant love song which describes the lasting emotional hurt of one party in a love triangle. "Hot Winter" is the Chinese version of Monrose's "Hot Summer", and it is a hardcore heavy beat dance song. It takes environmental issue as the starting point to describe modern people's positive love attitude.

Title and artwork 
The album's title "Butterfly" implies Tsai "breaking into a butterfly", and Tsai said: "I want to tell all the girls through the album, you should insist to be yourself, don't be afraid of other people's views, and be a beautiful butterfly." The album's standard cover art features Tsai wearing a pastel mini dress designed by The Blonds.

Release and promotion 
The album was available for pre-order at all 7-Eleven stores on March 4, 2009 and at all record stores and online marketplaces on March 12, 2009 in Taiwan. On March 12, 2009, Tsai held an album preview session in Taipei, Taiwan. On March 23, 2009, Warner and Chunghwa Telecom jointly announced that they would release a digital edition of the album, which additionally includes a behind-the-scenes footage and the music video of "Butterfly", and it's the first digital album in Taiwan's history. On March 28, 2009, Tsai embarked on the Butterfly Campus Tour at Chung Hua University in Hsinchu, Taiwan. On March 29, 2009, Warner announced that the album had sold more than 120,000 copies in Taiwan. On April 7, 2008, it was revealed that Tsai had decided to cancel a planned concert tour which was expected to start in the same year, the tour was planned to begin in September 2009 and have 10 shows in Asia, and Tsai's manager Howard Chiang said: "She's probably going to take a long break since September." On May 9, 2009, Tsai held the Butterfly Concert in Taichung, Taiwan. 

On May 22, 2009, Tsai released the ultimate edition of the album, and it additionally includes five music videos. In the same month, Tsai cancelled the remaining shows of the Butterfly Campus Tour due to reoccurrence of her old injury, and the tour eventually comprises only four shows. On June 2, 2009, Tsai held a press conference for the album in Beijing, China, and announced that it had sold more than 1 million copies in Asia. It peaked at number one on the weekly album sales charts of Chia Chia, Five Music, and G-Music in Taiwan. As of December 31, 2009, it had sold more than 210,000 copies in Taiwan, and it topped the 2009 album sales charts of Five Music and G-Music, becoming the year's highest-selling album in the country.

Live performances 
On April 2, 2009, Tsai recorded the Chinese television show Star Magic 2009 and performed "Butterfly", "Real Man", and "Compromise". On April 3, 2009, Tsai performed "Butterfly", "Slow Life", and "Compromise" on the Chinese television show, Yin Yue Ji Jie Hao. On April 5, 2009, Tsai recorded the Chinese television show Happy Camp and performed "Real Man" and "Compromise". On April 26, 2009, Tsai performed "Butterfly" and "Real Man" at the 2009 Music Radio China Top Chart Awards. On May 2, 2009, Tsai performed "Real Man" at the J.S.G. Selections (Part 1). On July 11, 2009, Tsai performed "Butterfly" at the Chinese television show The Same Song.

On August 8, 2009, Tsai recorded the Chinese television show Pepsi's Voice of the New Generation and performed "Compromise". On August 9, 2009, Tsai performed "Compromise", "Real Man" and "Hot Winter" at the 2009 Metro Radio Mandarin Hits Music Awards. On September 2, 2009, Tsai performed "Compromise" at the Chinese television show, Super Talk Show. On January 24, 2010, Tsai performed "Compromise" at the 5th KKBox Music Awards. On February 12, 2010, Tsai performed "Real Man" and "Compromise" at a concert in Hualien, Taiwan. On April 24, 2009, Tsai performed "Butterfly" at the 2010 Music Radio China Top Chart Awards. Since then, Tsai performed songs from the album at a series of other events.

Single and music videos 

On March 8, 2009, Tsai premiered the music video of "Real Man" on the Asia's largest LED-screen at The Place in Beijing, China, where she held a promotional event for the music video. It was directed by Marlboro Lai, and features Nick Chou. The choreography in the music video was choreographed by Jonte' Moaning. On March 9, 2009, Tsai released the single, "Real Man".

On March 23, 2009, Tsai released the music video of "Compromise". It was directed by Hsu Yun-hsuan, and it features Taiwanese actor Ethan Juan. On March 30, 2009, Tsai released the music video of "Butterfly", which was directed by Marlboro Lai. The choreography in the music video was choreographed by Bobby Newberry. It also features Tsai performing ballet routines, and she said: "Ballet is really hard to dance, ballerinas usually have to learn 10 to 20 years, and I only had three months to learn, so I only learned part of the essence, for instance the 32 fouetté from Swan Lake, but I can only do 20 fouetté, I really admire those ballerinas especially after I started to learn ballet, I also have a lot of room to improve, so I will also continue to practice." On April 14, 2009, Tsai released the music video of "Slow Life", which was directed by Marlboro Lai. On April 24, 2009, Tsai released the music video of "Accompany with Me", which was directed by Hsu Jun-ting and features Taiwanese actress Ivy Chen and actor Jason Tsou. "Real Man" and "Butterfly" reached number 25 and number 10 on the 2009 Hit FM Top 100 Singles of the Year, respectively.

Critical reception 

Writing for NetEase, Xiao Huanxiong commented: "On the whole, Butterfly is absolutely a rare high quality commercial dance-pop album", and added: "We saw Tsai has not only improved her dancing skill, but her grasp and performance of ballads also raised to a higher level." Writing for Smart Info Magazine, Fei Bi'an gave the album 3 out of 5 stars, and wrote: "The tracks are popular, but after waited for a long time, Tsai plays safe without surprise and sincerity. She's been the top C-pop female singer for years, but her breakthrough on music is far less than that on her extreme challenges of dancing."

Ai Diren from NetEase commented: "In fact, Tsai's current embarrassment is also a common symptom in C-pop industry. On the one hand, dance-pop is another important music genre compared to ballad. On the other hand, Chinese production teams have no way to produce really good dance songs." Freshmusic gave the album 5 out of 10 stars, and wrote: "If it were an album from a new artist, the critical reception might be not too bad. But if it is the album from our C-pop diva after signed with her new label, what a disappointment." Music critic Harry commented: "I think she needs to spend some time on music other than dancing skills. Otherwise, in the end, everyone will only remember her excellent dancing skills but not her music, thus putting the cart before the horse."

Accolades 
On May 3, 2009, "Real Man" won Favorite Mandarin Song at J.S.G. Selections (Part 1). On August 9, 2009, Tsai won Metro Radio Mandarin Hits Music Awards for Singer of the Year, Best Dancing Singer, and Best Stage Performance, "Real Man" won Best Dance Song, and "Compromise" won Top Songs. On December 20, 2009, Tsai won Migu Music Awards for Top Selling Female Singer and Top Album Selling Female Singer.

On January 23, 2010, "Real Man" won My Astro Music Awards for Top Dance Song and Top 20 Songs. On January 24, 2010, Tsai won a KKBox Music Award for Top 10 Singers. On January 31, 2010, "Compromise" won a Baidu Boiling Point Award for Top 10 Songs, and "Real Man" won Top 10 Songs, too. On April 11, 2010, Tsai won a Top Chinese Music Award for Most Influential Musicians of the Decade (Hong Kong/Taiwan), and "Butterfly" won Top 10 Songs of the Decade (Hong Kong/Taiwan). On April 24, 2010, Tsai won a Music Radio China Top Chart Award for Best Female Singer (Hong Kong/Taiwan), the album won Best Album (Hong Kong/Taiwan), and "Butterfly" won Top Songs (Hong Kong/Taiwan). In the same year, Tsai won a Hito Music Award for Most Weeks at Number One Album, and "Real Man" won Top 10 Songs.

Track listing

Release history

References

External links 
 
 

2009 albums
Jolin Tsai albums
Warner Music Taiwan albums